Leptolalax khasiorum is a species of frogs belonging to the genus Leptolalax. It is so far reported only from the type locality, from the subtropical wet forests of Mawphlang in Khasi Hills, Meghalaya, India. It is a small amphibian; the male measuring 25.6 mm, and female 32.5 mm. The species is diagnosed with unique features such as eyelids with tubercles, distinct tympanum and supratympanic folds, undilated toe tips with dermal fringes, dorsum with dark blotches, flanks with large dark blotches, dark tympanic mask, limbs with dark cross-bars, and distinct color patches.

References

External links 
 Wikispecies
 AmphibiaWeb

khasiorum
Endemic fauna of India
Frogs of India
Amphibians described in 2010